ANESVAD Foundation - non-profit and non-governmental organization, which supports health and social development projects in Asia, Latin America and Africa. Established in 1968 in Bilbao, Spain.

In 1970, ANESVAD began fighting against leprosy in the Philippines by the help with the help of Father Javier Olazábal S.I. Gradually, the organization spread its activities to different fields: general health assistance, preventing child sexual exploitation, Buruli ulcer, HIV/AIDS in different countries.

Besides projects in developing countries, ANESVAD provides public awareness and education campaigns for development in its homeland Spain. 

About 160,000 partners and collaborators from all over Spain support the ANESVAD operations, including the financial support from city councils, governmental institutions, and the AECI (Spanish Agency of International Cooperation).

The Foundation declares its main objectives, as health assistance, social development and public awareness. It works in Latin America (Argentina, Bolivia, Brazil, Ecuador, El Salvador, Guatemala, Mexico, Nicaragua, Peru, Dominican Republic, Venezuela), Asia (Bangladesh, Cambodia, China, Philippines, India, Laos,  Thailand, Vietnam), Africa (Benin, Cameroon, Côte d'Ivoire, Eritrea, Ghana), Europe (Spain, Geneva).

ANESVAD spent  1,551,183 euro (2005) and 1,541,831 euro (2006) on its projects on health care assistance in Vietnam.

References

External links
ANESVAD official page

This article is related to the List of non-governmental organizations in Vietnam.

 Organizations established in 1968
 Foreign charities operating in Vietnam
 Foundations based in Spain
Medical and health organisations based in Spain